Scandinavica: An international journal of Scandinavian studies is a semiannual journal of Scandinavian studies.

Scandinavian studies
Biannual journals
European studies journals
Publications established in 1962